In military terms, 72nd Division or 72nd Infantry Division may refer to:

 Infantry divisions 
 72nd Infantry Division (France) 
 72nd Infantry Division (Wehrmacht)
 72nd Division (Imperial Japanese Army)
 72nd Infantry Division (Philippine Commonwealth Army) 
 72nd Mechanized Brigade (Soviet Union) 
 72nd Division (Spain)
 72nd Division (United Kingdom)
 72nd Infantry Division (United States) 

 Cavalry divisions 
 72nd Cavalry Division (Philippine Commonwealth Army) 

 Armoured divisions 
 72nd Armored Division (Philippine Commonwealth Army)